Ousmane Baldé (born 31 December 1989) is a Guinean international footballer who plays as a midfielder for Tours FC.

Career 
In July 2015, Baldé signed for Portuguese second-highest division club Olhanense. He finished the season with 29 appearances and one goal, scoring for a 2–0 home win against Braga B on 21 November 2015.

After 2 years with Vereya, he moved to Tours FC in January 2019.

International career 
In March 2017, Baldé was called up to the Guinea national football team for the first time ahead of a friendlies against Gabon and against Cameroon. He made his debut on 24 March in the 2–2 draw against Gabon at the Stade Océane in Le Havre, France, playing the full 90 minutes.

References

External links 
 
 

1989 births
Living people
Guinean footballers
Guinean expatriate footballers
Guinea international footballers
Championnat National players
Championnat National 2 players
Championnat National 3 players
Liga Portugal 2 players
Segunda División B players
First Professional Football League (Bulgaria) players
Getafe CF B players
ÉFC Fréjus Saint-Raphaël players
S.C. Olhanense players
FC Vereya players
Tours FC players
Guinean expatriate sportspeople in Spain
Guinean expatriate sportspeople in Portugal
Guinean expatriate sportspeople in Bulgaria
Expatriate footballers in Spain
Expatriate footballers in Portugal
Expatriate footballers in Bulgaria
Association football midfielders